Rani Mulyasari (born 4 March 1993) is an Indonesian footballer who plays a midfielder for Persiba Putri and the Indonesia women's national team.

Club career
Mulyasari has played for Persiba Putri in Indonesia.

International career 
Mulyasari represented Indonesia at the 2022 AFC Women's Asian Cup.

International goals

References

External links

1993 births
Living people
People from Tangerang
Sportspeople from Banten
Indonesian women's footballers
Women's association football midfielders
Indonesia women's international footballers